The three teams in this group played against each other on a home-and-away basis. The group winner France qualified for the sixth FIFA World Cup held in Sweden.

Table

Matches

References

External links
FIFA official page
RSSSF - 1958 World Cup Qualification
Allworldcup

2
1957 in Icelandic football
1956–57 in French football
qual
1956–57 in Belgian football
1957–58 in Belgian football